I Got a Girl may refer to:
 "I Got a Girl" (Lou Bega song)
 "I Got a Girl" (Tripping Daisy song)